Lee Hyun-seung (Hangul: 이현승, Hanja: 李賢承; born October 11, 1983) is a South Korean left-handed relief pitcher who plays for the Doosan Bears of the KBO League.

Amateur career
As a junior at Dongsan High School in Incheon, South Korea, Lee was selected by the Hyundai Unicorns with the 26th pick in the 2nd round (34th overall) of the 2002 KBO Draft. Upon graduation from Dongsan High School, however, he chose to enter Inha University instead of turning pro directly.

Lee, the youngest player on the roster, helped his team to claim the silver medal, coming on in relief as a left-handed specialist and pitching four scoreless innings in the tourney.

As a junior In , Lee competed for the South Korea national baseball team in the 2nd World University Baseball Championship in Tainan City, Taiwan. There he led his team to bronze medal alongside Oh Seung-Hwan and Jang Won-Sam.

Notable international careers

Professional career

After the season, Lee competed for the South Korea national baseball team in the 2006 Intercontinental Cup. In the round-robin, he earned a save, pitching two scoreless innings to close out a 5-1 win over Italy. In the 5th-8th classification game, however, he blew a save opportunity, allowing three runs in the 9th inning of an 8-3 loss to Italy.

In , Lee suffered a case of the sophomore jinx, slipping to 1-2 with a 7.15 ERA in 22.2 innings pitched and earning only 2 holds in 45 games. He spent most of the season in the reserve team of the Unicorns.

Lee earned a spot in the starting rotation for the  season. In his first year as a full-time starter, he ended the season with a record of 6 wins and 11 losses and a 4.58 ERA in 120 innings pitched.

In , Lee had his best pro season. As a full-time starter, he was 4th in wins (13), 5th in innings pitched (170.0), 10th in strikeouts (120) and 11th in ERA (4.18), all of which were career bests. However, on December 30, Lee was traded to the Doosan Bears for pitcher Keum Min-Chul and one billion won, involved in the Heroes' postseason blockbuster trades.

In  Lee started his first season in the Bears as a starter, but was demoted to the bullpen in the middle of the season due to finger injuries and ongoing trouble with his command. He finished the season with a 4.75 ERA in 77.2 innings pitched and a 3-6 record. In the postseason, however, Lee played a major role in the Bears' bullpen, going 1-0 with a 0.96 ERA in 7 games, compiling 11 strikeouts in 9.1 innings pitched.

In  Lee spent the entire season in relief, compiling a 3–5 record with four saves, six holds and a 4.82 ERA in 74.2 innings of work spread over 50 appearances.

Notable international careers

Nickname
He made the bases loaded and often showed his escape from the crisis, earning him the nickname of a bases-loaded pervert from his fans.

References

External links
 Career statistics and player information from KBO

1983 births
Living people
Sportspeople from Incheon
Doosan Bears players
Kiwoom Heroes players
Hyundai Unicorns players
KBO League pitchers
South Korean baseball players
Inha University alumni
2015 WBSC Premier12 players
2017 World Baseball Classic players